Hippuric acid (Gr. hippos, horse, ouron, urine) is a carboxylic acid and organic compound.  It is found in urine and is formed from the combination of benzoic acid and glycine. Levels of hippuric acid rise with the consumption of phenolic compounds (such as fruit juice, tea and wine). The phenols are first converted to benzoic acid, and then to hippuric acid and excreted in urine.

Hippuric acid crystallizes in rhombic prisms which are readily soluble in hot water, melt at 187 °C, and decompose at about 240 °C. High concentrations of hippuric acid may also indicate a toluene intoxication; however, scientists have called this correlation into question because there are other variables that affect  levels of hippuric acid.  When many aromatic compounds such as benzoic acid and toluene are taken internally, they are converted to hippuric acid by reaction with the amino acid, glycine.

Synthesis
A modern synthesis of hippuric acid involves the acylation of glycine with benzoyl chloride:

Physiology 
Biochemically, hippuric acid is produced from benzoic acid by direct glycine acylation.  It is one of the two conjugates of benzoic acid produced metabolically, the other being the glucuronide.  Both are eliminated from the body in urine.  Benzoic acid is introduced into the body by ingestion (sodium benzoate is used as a preservative) and by hydrolysis of pharmaceutical agents such as benzyl benzoate.

Hippuric acid may be formed from the essential amino acid phenylalanine through at least two pathways. Phenylalanine undergoes biotransformation to form an alpha-keto acid, phenylpyruvic acid, which can tautomerize to a reactive enol. The benzylic carbon is reactive which undergoes peroxidation followed by the competing pathways to either react with the alpha carbon subsequently form an dioxetanol intermediate followed by formation of oxalic acid and benzaldehyde, or, peroxidation can react with the carboxyl group to form an alpha-keto-beta-peroxylactone intermediate followed by formation of carbon monoxide, carbon dioxide, and benzaldehyde. Alternatively, under certain conditions, phenylpyruvic acid may undergo a redox mechanism, such as Iron(II) donating an electron, to directly release carbon dioxide, followed by carbon monoxide, for the formation of a stable toluene radical which is resolved by an antioxidant such as ascorbate. In all of the aforementioned cases, benzaldehyde undergoes biotransformation via CYP450 to benzoic acid followed by conjugation to glycine for formation of hippurate which undergoes urinary excretion. Similarly, toluene reacts with CYP450 to form benzaldehyde.

Hippuric acid has been reported to be a marker for Parkinson's disease.

Reactions
Hippuric acid is readily hydrolysed by hot caustic alkalis to benzoic acid and glycine. Nitrous acid converts it into benzoyl glycolic acid, C6H5C(=O)OCH2CO2H. Its ethyl ester reacts with hydrazine to form hippuryl hydrazine, C6H5CONHCH2CONHNH2, which was used by Theodor Curtius for the preparation of hydrazoic acid.

History
Justus von Liebig showed in 1829 that hippuric acid differed from benzoic acid and he named it, and in 1834 he determined its constitution, while in 1853 French chemist Victor Dessaignes (1800–1885) synthesized it by the action of benzoyl chloride on the zinc salt of glycine. It was also formed by heating benzoic anhydride with glycine, and by heating benzamide with monochloroacetic acid.

See also
 Aminohippuric acid
 ortho-Iodohippuric acid
 Methylhippuric acid

References

Acetic acids
Benzamides
Phenyl compounds